Fox Showcase (formerly known as Showcase) is an Australian premium drama cable and satellite television channel. It was initially part of the Showtime Australia channels and was managed by PMP chief executive officer Peter Rose. In 2007 Rose said Showcase "provides a real home at last for quality drama in Australia, and this list of outstanding event television is just the start". Showcase launched with the Australian TV premieres of Dexter and Australian-made series Satisfaction.

FOX Showcase is now owned and operated by Foxtel Networks; and is their flagship entertainment channel, and airs programming with no ad breaks during shows.

FOX Showcase can be found on channel 114 on Foxtel and Optus TV.

Foxtel took over managing and producing Showcase and the other Showtime channels as of 31 October 2012, with it purchasing assets of the PMP. On 9 December 2012, it was announced that Movie Network and Showtime (with the exception of Showcase) would be replaced with a new lineup of Foxtel-branded movie channels to be named Foxtel Movies Showcase would continue to be the home of premium dramas from HBO and other international networks, original programming, documentaries, and independent films.

On 3 November 2014 Showcase moved from Foxtel's Premium Movies and Drama package to the newly founded Drama package. In addition, the channel moved from channel 404 to channel 115 and showcase + 2 moved from channel 414 to channel 158.

Following the closure of SoHo and the launch of the channel Binge on 5 October 2016, showcase moved to channel 114.

Background

Showcase launched with the Australian premiere of Satisfaction, based around high-class Australian escorts and their clients. The show ran for three seasons.

Showcase also aired all three series of Love My Way, a series which moved from FOX8 to W to Showtime each season yet was re-run on Showcase all together for the first time in 2007–2008.

In 2008, Foxtel and Showcase announced a new Australian drama called Tangle. Tangle is from the makers of Love My Way, and features an all-star Australian cast of Matt Day, Kat Stewart, Justine Clarke, Ben Mendelsohn and Catherine McClements. The series debuted on 1 October 2009 to rave reviews: "Tangle puts Free to Air Television to shame. Australian drama desperately needs more voices that emanate from truth".

In 2010 Showtime commissioned a 6-hour mini-series Cloudstreet based on the novel by Tim Winton. The series premiered on 22 May 2011. The stellar cast includes Essie Davis as Dolly Pickles, Stephen Curry as Sam Pickles, Emma Booth as Rose Pickles, Kerry Fox as Oriel Lamb, Geoff Morrell as Lester Lamb, and with Todd Lasance as Quick Lamb and NIDA graduate Hugo Johnstone-Burt as Fish Lamb.

Original programming
Love My Way (2007) - previously aired on FOX8 (2004) and W Channel (2005)
Satisfaction (2007–10)
Tangle (2009–12)
Cloudstreet (2011)
Devil's Playground (2014)
Deadline Gallipoli (2015)
Secret City (2016–19) - co-production with Netflix
The Kettering Incident (2016)
A Place to Call Home (2016–18) - previously aired on Seven (2013–14) and SoHo (2015)
Wentworth (2017–21) - previously aired on SoHo (2013–16)
Picnic at Hanging Rock (2018)
Mr Inbetween (2018–21) - co-production with FX
Fighting Season (2018)
Lambs of God (2019)
Upright (2019–22) - co-production with Sky Atlantic (season 1) and Sky Comedy (season 2)
The End (2020) - co-production with Sky Atlantic
The Twelve (2022)

Overseas programming
Many of the programs featured on FOX Showcase are Australian premieres, and feature on cable networks in America which feature adult themes and mature issues such as HBO, Showtime and FX in America. At Foxtel's 2013 programming highlights presentation on 26 February 2013, Foxtel announced an agreement with HBO that was to see HBO content be exclusively shown on Showcase, with it not to screen on free to air television for at least five years.

 The Affair
 Allegiance
 The Americans
American Horror Story Apocalypse
 Bates Motel
 The Big C
 Big Little Lies
 Better Things
 Breaking Bad
 Boardwalk Empire
 Bored to Death
 Braquo
 Brotherhood
 Californication
 The Corner
 Dexter
 Divorce
 Eastbound & Down
 Elementary
 Entourage
 Fear the Walking Dead
 The Firm
 Funny or Die Presents
 Game of Thrones 
 Generation Kill
 Girls
 The Good Wife
 Graceland
 House of Cards
 House of the Dragon
 House of Saddam
 How to Make It in America
 Hung
 In Treatment
 John Adams
 John from Cincinnati
 The Killing
 Law & Order: SVU
 The Life and Times of Tim
 Lip Service
 Longmire
 Looking
 Mad Men (season 6)
 Major Crimes
 Mildred Pierce
 Nashville
 The Newsroom
 Orange Is the New Black
 Outlander
 The Pacific
 Raised By Wolves
 The Riches
 The Ricky Gervais Show
 Rizzoli & Isles
 Rogue
 Romanzo criminale
 Saving Grace
 Scandal
 Shameless
 Sleeper Cell
 Sons of Anarchy
 The Sopranos
 Togetherness
 Treme
 True Blood
 The Tudors
 Vinyl
 The West Wing
Westworld (series, 2016– )
 White Collar
 The Walking Dead

See also
 Showtime movie channels

References

External links
 Official site

Television networks in Australia
Television channels and stations established in 2007
2007 establishments in Australia
Foxtel
English-language television stations in Australia
Commercial-free television networks in Australia